Stellaria calycantha is a species of flowering plant in the family Caryophyllaceae known by the common name northern starwort. It is native to western North America from Alaska and northwestern Canada to California and New Mexico, as well as eastern Russia. It occurs in subalpine and alpine climates, in many types of moist, shady habitats. It is a rhizomatous perennial herb producing a prostrate to erect stem up to 25 centimeters long, taking a clumpy form. The thin oval leaves have smooth edges and pointed tips, and measure up to 2.5 centimeters in length. The inflorescence bears one or more flowers, each on a long pedicel. Each flower has five pointed green sepals, and some flowers have up to five deeply lobed white petals.

References

External links
Jepson Manual Treatment
Flora of North America

calycantha
Flora of the Russian Far East
Flora of Eastern Europe
Flora of Subarctic America
Flora of Western Canada
Flora of the Northwestern United States
Flora of the Southwestern United States
Flora of the South-Central United States
Flora without expected TNC conservation status